Manuel Blanc (born 12 June 1968) is a French television and film actor.

Partial filmography
1991: I Don't Kiss - Pierre Lacaze
1993: A Crime - Frédéric Chapelin-Tourvel
1994: Des feux mal éteints - Jérôme
1994: Lou n'a pas dit non - Pierre
1995: Le roi de Paris - Paul Derval
1995: La Rivière Espérance (TV Mini-Series) - Benjamin Donadieu
1996: Beaumarchais - Gudin
1999: 1999 Madeleine - Gabriel
2000: Drug Scenes (TV Series) - Renaud
2000: Exit - Junk
2002: Vivante - Paul
2002: Two - Man with the flower / Russian officer / Henri L. / French officer / Man on the beach
2002: Mes parents - Le journaliste
2003: Je t'aime, je t'adore - Laurent
2005: Avant qu'il ne soit trop tard - Doug
2005: Telma demain - The teacher
2006: Exes - Homme de l'impasse 1
2010: Blind Test - Bertrand
2013: Holy Thursday (Short, by Antony Hickling) - Dieu
2013: Little Gay Boy, chrisT is Dead (by Antony Hickling and Amaury Grisel) - Dieu
2013: Little Gay Boy (A Triptych by Antony Hickling) - Dieu
2014: One Deep Breath (by Antony Hickling and André Schneider) - Maël
2016: Where Horses Go To Die - Manuela / Marco
2017: Capitaine Marleau (by Josée Dayan) - Alain Peras
2019: Persona non grata - Chargé d'affaires
 2021 : ''Down in Paris by Antony Hickling

References

External links
 

1968 births
Living people
French male film actors
French male television actors
People from Boulogne-Billancourt
Most Promising Actor César Award winners